In the course of her  professional life the English contralto Kathleen Ferrier made a large number of recordings. In the summer of 1944 she signed a contract with Columbia, which lasted until February 1946. She then transferred to Decca, and remained with them until her death in October 1953. Apart from her studio recordings, many of her live performances and broadcast recitals were recorded, sometimes privately. Some of these were later issued as commercial recordings; others are held by individuals or in the archives of broadcasting companies. 

The following list is neither up to date nor entirely accurate, particularly in regard to a CD issue, entitled 'Kathleen Ferrier Remembered', released in June 2017, on SOMM264, comprising 26 tracks, 19 of which have never previously been issued. Most of these 19 are not listed below. They include Lieder by Schubert, Brahms, Wolf and Mahler and songs by Stanford, Parry, Jacobson and Rubbra, all taken from BBC broadcasts between 1947 and 1952. 

In April 2019, a recording of Ferrier singing in Bach's 'Magnificat' during the 1950 Vienna International Bach Festival was issued for the first time. The CD catalogue number is SOMM Ariadne 5004 and it also features Irmgard Seefried and Friedl Riegler (sopranos), Hugo Meyer-Welfing (tenor) and Otto Edelmann (bass). The Vienna Philharmonic Orchestra and Chorus of the Vienna State Opera are conducted by Volkmar Andreae. The existence of this recording was not known until a vinyl disc was offered for sale on an internet auction site in 2018. In superb recorded sound, this discovery is a real treasure and completes the recordings available of the three works in which Ferrier sang at the 1950 Vienna Bach Festival.    

Many of Ferrier's recordings were initially issued on 78 rpm discs. In due course these and later recordings were reissued in other formats: Long-playing (LP), cassette tape and compact disc (CD). The tables list only the dates and locations of the initial recordings. 

In 2012 Decca issued a 14-CD + 1-DVD boxed set (Kathleen Ferrier: Centenary Edition - The Complete Decca Recordings) which comprises all recordings published by that company, including several important 'off-air' recordings to which they had the rights.

In the same year, EMI issued a 3-CD set (Kathleen Ferrier - The Complete EMI Recordings) comprising all her extant recordings for that company plus two previously unissued takes from the 1949 'Kindertotenlieder' and a complete recording of Gluck's 'Orfeo ed Euridice', to which they had the rights.

Paul Campion's book 'Ferrier - A Career Recorded' (second edition, published by Thames in 2005 and now distributed by Music Sales) contains details of all Ferrier recordings known at the time of publication.

Studio recordings, 1944–52

Recordings of broadcasts and live performances, 1945–53

Footnotes
The Appendix to Winifred Ferrier's The Life of Kathleen Ferrier contains "taken from her own notebook, a list of what she sang" (pp. 185-91); under Folk Songs arrangers of some of the songs are recorded, e.g. Whittaker for "Blow the wind southerly".

References

Campion, Paul (2005). Ferrier – a Career Recorded. London: Thames Publishing. .

Ferrier, Kathleen
Ferrier, Kathleen